The Kitahama is a residential building in Kitahama, Chuo-ku, Osaka, Japan. Rising 209m tall, it is the fourth tallest building in Osaka Prefecture, and the 22nd tallest building in Japan. It is also the tallest residential building in Japan. The closest train station to it is Kitahama Station.

See also
 Kōraibashi
 List of tallest buildings in Osaka Prefecture

References

Skyscrapers in Osaka
Residential skyscrapers in Japan